Chan Nak (27 May 1892 – 7 November 1954) was a Cambodian politician who served as the Prime Minister of Cambodia from 1953 to 1954. He was the second prime minister of an independent Cambodia, following Penn Nouth.

Before being appointed the prime minister, Nak served as the Minister of Justice in 1945, 1945–1946 and 1950, the Interior Minister from 1953–1954 and the Information Minister from 1953 to 1954.

References

 

20th-century Cambodian politicians 
Prime Ministers of Cambodia
Interior ministers of Cambodia 
1892 births
1954 deaths
Government ministers of Cambodia
Cambodian Buddhists